Alain Reimann (born 20 April 1967) is a Swiss sprinter. He competed in the men's 200 metres at the 1996 Summer Olympics.

References

1967 births
Living people
Athletes (track and field) at the 1996 Summer Olympics
Swiss male sprinters
Olympic athletes of Switzerland
Place of birth missing (living people)